There are at least 15 named lakes and reservoirs in Prairie County, Montana.

Lakes

Reservoirs
 Airport Reservoir. , el. 
 Archdale Reservoir. , el. 
 Ban Reservoir Number 1. , el. 
 Clark Reservoir. , el. 
 Coal Creek Reservoir. , el. 
 Grant Reservoir. , el. 
 Homestead Reservoir. , el. 
 Horse Reservoir. , el. 
 Hunter Creek Reservoir. , el. 
 Innes Reservoir. , el. 
 Little Garrison Reservoir. , el. 
 McClure Reservoir. , el. 
 Papps Reservoir. , el. 
 Silvertip Reservoir. , el. 
 South Fork Reservoir. , el.

See also
 List of lakes in Montana

Notes

Bodies of water of Prairie County, Montana
Prairie